Paolo and Francesca is a sculptural group by Auguste Rodin, showing Paolo and Francesca da Rimini, damned lovers from Canto V of Dante's The Divine Comedy.

Gates of Hell
The couple appeared in several of Rodin's initial drawings between 1880 and 1881 for The Gates of Hell. In the first version he placed them in the centre, in a work that later appeared on its own as The Kiss. This piece was removed from Gates by the artist in 1886 and replaced by a new version, closer to the description of the lovers in Dante's text.

See also
List of sculptures by Auguste Rodin

References

External links

Sculptures by Auguste Rodin
1885 sculptures
Works based on Inferno (Dante)